Free economic zones (FEZ), free economic territories (FETs) or free zones (FZ) are a class of special economic zone (SEZ) designated by the trade and commerce administrations of various countries. The term is used to designate areas in which companies are taxed very lightly or not at all to encourage economic activity. The taxation rules and duties are determined by each country. The World Trade Organization (WTO) Agreement on Subsidies and Countervailing Measures (SCM) has content on the conditions and benefits of free zones.

Some special economic zones are called free ports. Sometimes they have historically been endowed with favorable customs regulations, such as the free port of Trieste.

Definition
The definition should be understood in meaning The International Convention on the Simplification and Harmonization of Customs Procedures (Revised Kyoto Convention) uses the term “free zones” which the revised convention describes as “a part of the territory of a Contracting Party where any goods introduced are generally regarded, insofar as import duties and taxes are concerned, as being outside the customs territory”.

History 
An early type of special economic zone was free ports, these historically were endowed with favorable customs regulations. In modern times, free port has come to mean a specific type of special economic zone, for example LADOL.

All "free ports" in the world were permitted by the respective states, save the Free Port of Trieste that with the signing of the 16th Resolution of the Security Council of the United Nations (10 January 1947) and the signing of the Treaty of Peace with Italy (10 February 1947, ratified 15 September 1947) was put territorially under the sovereignty of the United Nations itself. As cited on Annex VIII, Article 3, paragraph 2: "The establishment of special zones in the Free Port under the exclusive jurisdiction of any State is incompatible with the status of the Free Territory and of the Free Port". For example, it was not possible to apply the "Italian Law on Ports" in the extraterritorial free zones of the UN Free Port of Trieste with the effect that all actual territorial concessions were null and void.

In 1954 the Free Territory of Trieste was dissolved and given to its neighbours, Italy and Yugoslavia.

Criminal use

The European Union in 2020 introduced new stricter rules to identify and report suspicious activities at free ports and zones in response to the "high incidence of corruption, tax evasion, and criminal activity", with a further review to take place in the following year, The European Parliament suggested that increasing demand for free ports could be partly a response to global crackdowns on tax evasion. The European Commission in a report said that free ports were popular for the storage of art, precious stones, antiques, gold and wine as alternative assets to cash, and posed an emerging threat in multiple ways: allowing counterfeiters to land consignments and tamper with loads and paperwork, then re-export the products without customs formalities, disguising the actual origin and nature of the goods and their supplier. The commission said they were also used for narcotics trafficking, the illegal ivory trade, people smuggling, VAT fraud, corruption and money laundering. "Legal businesses owned by criminals remain key to money-laundering activities ... Free ports are perceived as facilities that protect their clients' identity and financial dealings, much as private banks used to." As an example the commission cited Swiss authorities' 2016 seizure of cultural relics looted from the Middle East being stored in Geneva's free ports.

The free port system has been accused of facilitating international art crime, allowing stolen artworks to remain undetected in storage for decades. Freeports' lax regulation enables criminals to operate in secrecy. Freeports may facilitate money laundering and tax evasion by obscuring the real beneficial owners of criminal assets, which hinders authorities' efforts to trace criminal profits and recover taxes.

List of free economic zones by country

See also
 Bonded logistics park - another type of SEZ
 Free-trade zone - another type of SEZ
 Free-trade area
 Bonded warehouse
 Four Asian Tigers

References

Bibliography

External links
 List of Free Zones in United Arab Emirates